Pooradam Thirunal Sethu Lakshmi Bayi CI (5 November 1895– 22 February 1985) was the monarch, though designated as the Regent due to British policy, of the Kingdom of Travancore in southern India between 1924 and 1931. She, along with her younger cousin, Moolam Thirunal Sethu Parvathi Bayi, were adopted into the Travancore Royal Family and were the granddaughters of the celebrated painter, Raja Ravi Varma.

In 1924, Maharajah Moolam Thirunal died and his grand nephew and the heir to the throne, Sree Chithira Thirunal, was just 12 years old then. A regency became necessary, since the Maharajah was still a minor. Since Travancore royal family followed the matrilineal system, Sethu Lakshmi Bayi was the head of the family. It was decided, despite the opposition of the minor Maharajah's mother, Junior Maharani Sethu Parvathi Bayi, that Sethu Lakshmi Bayi should be Regent as she was the Senior Maharani until the minor King came of age in 1930. She was an absolute monarch in her own right as per matrilineal law (unlike regents in the rest of India whose powers were curtailed by tradition and in practice by a regency council) and ruled as the sovereign.

Sethu Lakshmi Bayi's regency continued the progressive administration of Travancore Dynasty and brought forth reforms like abolition of Devadasi system as well as the prohibition of animal sacrifice. Her meeting with Mahatma Gandhi resulted in a royal proclamation by which all the public roads (except the eastern road) to Vaikom Mahadeva Temple were opened to all castes. She also amended the Travancore Nayar Act in relation to the Marumakkathayam system of inheritance and family. Eventually in 1928, the matrilineal system was altogether done away with, introducing patrilineal nuclear family system among Nairs. At the same time, Sethu Lakshmi Bayi was criticized by social reformers for not allowing temple entry for dalits and also for preventing Jawaharlal Nehru from entering the Padmanabhaswamy Temple as Nehru had undertaken a sea voyage. She was also criticized for formulating the notorious Press Regulation Act in 1926 which gagged the Press.

Early life

Sethu Lakshmi Bayi was born on 19 November 1895 to Ayilyam Nal Mahaprabha of the Utsavamadhom Palace in Mavelikara and Kerala Varma. Her mother belonged to a branch of the Kolathunad Royal Family that had settled in Travancore towards the end of the 18th century and was one of daughters of the artist Raja Ravi Varma. The Mavelikara family was closely associated with the Travancore Royal Family as Mahaprabha's and sister Thiruvathira Nal Bhagirathi Bayi Uma Kochukunji's direct aunts, Senior Maharani Lakshmi Bayi and Junior Maharani Parvathi Bayi had been adopted and installed as the Maharanis of Travancore in 1858. This adoption, which was the 6th in the Travancore House, was without results as the Senior Rani Lakshmi Bayi, who was married to Kerala Varma Valiya Koil Thampuran was childless while the Junior Maharani Parvathi Bayi had only sons.

In the prevalent matrilineal system of inheritance known as Marumakkathayam, the presence of females to continue the line and dynasty was crucial. With the death of the Junior Maharani Parvathy Bayi in 1893, followed by that of the eldest of her three sons in 1895, the royal family came to consist solely of Maharajah Moolam Thirunal, Rani Lakshmi Bayi and her two nephews. The Senior Maharani decided to adopt the daughters of her nieces, Mahaprabha and Kochukunji of Mavelikara, into the Travancore Royal Family. Subsequently, a daughter was born to Mahaprabha in 1895, the child was named Sethu Lakshmi. The next year in 1896, Kochukunji gave birth to a daughter who was similarly named Sethu Parvathi. In 1900 Maharani Lakshmi Bayi formally petitioned Maharajah Moolam Thirunal for the adoption of her grand nieces, to perpetuate the ruling line and hence the two children were adopted. The adoption itself was met with some opposition from other branches of the Kolathunad family who nominated females from their families as also objections from the First Prince Chathayam Thirunal Rama Varma, but these were overcome and Sethu Lakshmi was adopted into the Travancore Royal Family as Junior Maharani and came to be known as Sree Padmanbahasevini Pooradom Thirunal Sethu Lakshmi Bayi and as the First Princess, Sree Padmanabhasevini Moolam Thirunal Sethu Parvathi Bayi.

Education and marriage

Within a year of the adoption of the Princesses in 1900, the two Princes, Chathayam Thirunal and Aswathy Thirunal died followed by Maharani Lakshmi Bayi herself in 1901. Thus at the age of six, Sethu Lakshmi Bayi succeeded her as Senior Maharani of Attingal while Sethu Parvathi Bayi became Junior Maharani of Attingal. Kerala Varma Valiya Koil Thampuran, consort of the late Senior Maharani Lakshmi Bayi, was appointed the guardian of the 2 minor queens and tutors were appointed to teach them. In 1906, when she was still ten years old, Sethu Lakshmi Bayi was married to Sri Rama Varma, a grandnephew of her guardian who belonged to the royal house of Haripad. Four years later in 1910 the marriage was consummated and the couple started living together. In 1910 she became pregnant but suffered a miscarriage. In 1912 having passed her minority, the Maharajah granted her the rights to assume control of the Sreepadom Estate. Meanwhile, the Junior Queen gave birth to her eldest son Chithira Thirunal Balarama Varma, the last ruling Maharajah of Travancore. He became the Heir-Apparent to Maharajah Moolam Thirunal. The Junior Maharani gave birth to three more children namely Karthika Thirunal Lakshmi Bayi in 1916 and Uthradom Thirunal Marthanda Varma in 1922. Her second child was still born. In 1923, Sethu Lakshmi Bayi gave birth to her elder daughter, Uthram Thirunal Lalithamba Bayi. Then in 1926 she gave birth to another girl child, Princess Indira bayi.

Ruler/Regent of Travancore
In 1924, Sethu Lakshmi Bayi received news that King Moolam Thirunal was critical due to sepsis. The Maharajah died leaving behind the 12-year-old Sree Chithira Thirunal Balarama Varma as heir to the throne. Since the Maharajah was still a minor, it was decided, despite the opposition of the minor Maharajah's mother, Sethu Parvathi Bayi, that Sethu Lakshmi Bayi should be Regent until the minor King came of age in 1930. However, it should be also noted that unlike the regents of any other kingdom, Sethu Lakshmi Bayi was entitled to many other perks which included absolute power which had been due to any other ruler of a princely state in India . This was on account of matrilineal tradition of the Travancore family where women had the equal power as well as right to rule, in absence of any male heir . Accordingly, Sethu Lakshmi Bayi was proclaimed Regent Maharani of Travancore and commenced the regency in September 1924. Sethu Lakshmi Bayi had a fraught relationship, marked by suspicion and bitterness, with the Maharaja's mother. In 1929, Sethu Lakshmi Bayi was decorated with the Order of the Crown of India.

The Reign/Regency
The regency had opened amidst many events including Vaikom Satyagraha. Soon after in 1925 Sethu Lakshmi Bayi was visited by Mahatma Gandhi. Their meeting resulted in a royal proclamation by which all the public roads (except the eastern road) to Vaikom Mahadeva Temple was opened to all castes. Mahatma Gandhi called it a "bedrock of freedom" in his Young India (26 March 1925) magazine.

During the time of her regency, Sethu Lakshmi Bayi lived at the Satelmond Palace in Poojapura. The regency was marked by many social reforms in Travancore. In 1925, animal sacrifice was banned in Travancore. In 1926 Sethu Lakshmi Bayi abolished devadasi system. Amendments were brought about in the same year in the Travancore Nayar Act pertaining to the Marumakkathayam system of inheritance and family, and eventually in 1928 the system was altogether done away with, introducing patrilineal nuclear family system in Travancore. Also a law was passed in 1925 fostering and developing local self-government in rural areas in the form of Panchayats. In 1926 she passed a notorious Newspaper Regulation Act which curbed many rights of the press. The Medical Department was modernised so as to provide better services. The Regent also appointed the first female doctor in Travancore as Durbar Physician and head of the Medical Department. In 1928 a Central Road Board was established and several new highways and roads were constructed across Travancore. The Quilon Ernakulam Railway was completed and Telephone services were thrown open for the public. By the end of the regency, the government was spending nearly 22% of the state's revenue on the Education Department. By mid 1931 it was decided that the accession of Sree Chithira Thirunal should take place after his 19th birthday. Thus accordingly in November 1931, after 7 years, the regency of Sethu Lakshmi Bayi came to an end and the Heir Apparent Chithira Thirunal Balarama Varma became the King of Travancore. During the regency, the revenues of Travancore had risen to more than Rs. 250,00,000/-.

After the Regency
After the regency Sethu Lakshmi Bayi retired from active involvement in the affairs to the state. She continued to look after affairs of the Sreepadom estate for sometime after which in 1939 the Maharajah Sree Chithira Thirunal assumed control of the estate and placed it in a trust from which all the female members of the royal family would receive allowances.

In 1935 and 1937 respectively the Regent received the King George V Silver Jubilee Medal and the King George VI Coronation Medal respectively. Sethu Lakshmi Bayi spent her time until 1947 in Travancore with her husband and two daughters. Her second daughter, Karthika Thirunal Indira Bayi was born in 1926.  In 1938 her elder daughter Princess Lalithamba Bayi was married to Sri Kerala Varma of Kilimanoor. Later in 1945 her younger daughter Princess Indira Bayi was married to a member of the Harippad family who, however, died in 1949. Thereafter in 1952 she was married to Kerala Varma of Kilimanoor, a cousin of her brother in law.

After Independence
After Independence in 1947 and the creation of Travancore-Cochin in 1949, Lalithamba Bayi moved away to Bangalore and settled there with her children. In the early 1950s Indira Bayi settled in Madras and Sethu Lakshmi Bayi was alone in Trivandrum. Slowly she started disposing the many properties and palaces and by the late 1950s was contemplating moving to Bangalore to be with her daughter and grandchildren. This was hastened in 1957 by her servants in the Palace forming a Union and asking for their rights. While it was strictly controlled and put down initially, it resurfaced in 1958 and the servants went on strike. About this time Sethu Lakshmi Bayi suffered a mild heart attack as well. Thereafter it was decided that she should stay with her family members in Bangalore. Thus in 1958 the she moved to Madras after leaving Trivandrum hastily, and by early 1959 moved to Bangalore where she constructed a bungalow for herself close to her daughter's house and took up residence there. She never returned to Travancore. Sethu Lakshmi Bayi lived in Bangalore for more than 25 years. In 1971 the Government of India abolished the Privy Purse in India given to former rulers and their families and thus Sethu Lakshmi Bayi stopped receiving her allowances. However, after a prolonged legal battle, a few years before her death, the pension granted her after the regency was reinstated. For many years, she had been bedridden and ill in Bangalore and in February 1985, Sethu Lakshmi Bayi died in Bangalore. She was at that time the last surviving member in the Order of the Crown of India.

The Malayala Manorama daily describes the reign of Sethu Lakshmi Bayi as follows:
.
 
Mahatma Gandhi about Sethu Lakshmi Bayi in his Young India (26 March 1925) magazine :

Mountbatten on Sethu Lakshmi Bayi :

Every year the Maharani Setu Lakshmi Bayi Memorial lecture is held in Trivandrum by the Travancore Royal Family. In 1995, on her 100th birth anniversary, her biography At the Turn of the Tide, written by her grand daughter Lakshmi Raghunandan was published by the "Maharani Setu Lakshmi Bayi Memorial Charitable Trust" in Bangalore.

Criticisms

 The Press Regulation Act of 1926 passed by the Regent Sethu Lakshmi Bayi is considered as a draconian law by the historians. The public protesters, headed by E. V. Krishna Pillai and T. K. Madhavan at Travancore Political Conference in Trivandrum, alleged that the new Press Act was solely formulated to protect the consort of Regent Maharani, Rama Varma Valiya Koyi Thampuran, from public criticism against his illegal interference in the administration of Travancore. It must be said in defence of the Newspaper Regulation Act that the measure was taken to protect ordinary citizens from mud slinging campaigns and scandals indulged in by small newspapers "which come into temporary existence with the special object of vilification and when the object is carried out these news sheets disappear" (United India and Indian States", Delhi, 31 July 1926). This Regulation was hailed by K. Gopalan Nair, a lawyer and member of the Sree Moolam Popular Assembly, as a measure long overdue. A public demonstration by only upper caste people held to discuss the pros and cons of this Regulation, ended in a vote being taken, wherein the resolution to scrap the Regulation, was defeated by the majority (as per the Report of the Inspector of Police, submitted to the Maharani Regent). Hence she had the support of the upper caste public when the Regulation was passed.

Many historians and researchers have criticized Sethu Lakshmi Bayi for not conducting temple entry for dalits in 1924. When Mahatma Gandhi came to Travancore for the Vaikom Satyagraha, he met the then Regent Sethu Lakshmi Bayi and asked her whether it was not atrocious that when dogs and cattle can walk the roads around temples but some men cannot due to their castes. Sethu Lakshmi Bayi replied that "it was wrong and most unfortunate" and added that "she was just a Regent" and that Gandhi should pose the question to Chithira Thirunal, the future king, who was then but a boy of 12 and the then minor King replied in the affirmative when Gandhi asked the same question to him. Mannathu Padmanabhan, in 1930, had openly criticized the Regent for this decision of not opening Hindu temples for the dalits and had accused that she was under the influence of Tamil Brahmins and that her excuse that as the Regent she had no power to decide, was a lie. He retorted that she had complete power to give temple entry but she simply refused to do the same. However, it must be pointed out that if she referred to herself as a mere Regent, unable to open the temples to the Dalits, it was a truth, because at the time of this meeting her powers as a Regent were yet to be decided upon by the Viceroy. Still, even after approval by viceroy, she did not allow temple entry for Dalits. In all other princely states of India, Regents were supported by Regency Councils which would pass legislations. In Travancore, however, owing to the matrilineal system of inheritance, the Maharani had as much authority as a Maharaja. This was a new concept to the British, hence the delay in recognizing her powers within the State. After many letters were exchanged between the Maharani and the A.G.G. in Madras, she was finally given full power to rule. Therefore, her plea to Gandhiji, that she was only a Regent at the time, was not a lie. However, even after she could exercise her authority she realized that it was too sudden and sweeping a change for the tradition bound people of Travancore to accept Temple entry for Dalits . Gandhiji appreciated this fact, for in his words "..the opening of the roads is not the final but the first step in the ladder of reform..... We may not force the pace" ("Young India", 2 April 1925).

In popular culture

Maharani Setu Lakshmi Bayi (spelled 'Sethu') is the central figure of The Ivory Throne: Chronicles of the House of Travancore, the debut work of Indian writer Manu S. Pillai. The book primarily focuses on the journey of the Maharani —beginning with her adoption and upbringing alongside the Junior Maharani Sethu Parvathi Bayi, her Regency during the minority of the Junior Maharani's son (and heir to the Throne) Chithira Thirunal Balarama Varma and the subsequent tensions that ensued between both the Maharanis after the termination of her Regency and the reign of the Maharaja. The book also chronicles the journey of her children as they departed from Kerala and breaking away from lifestyles of the Travancore Royal Family (which she herself later did when she moved to Bangalore), their adaptation to the era of the Indian independence movement and the subsequent dismantling of the monarchy during the formation of the Dominion of India. It also touches upon moments of historical significance, such as the development of Cochin Port during the Maharani's reign, the Temple Entry Proclamation and the rise of Communism in Kerala during the subsequent reign of Maharaja Chithira Thirunal Balarama Varma.

The popularity and critical reception of the book has led to interest in a screen adaptation.

Full Title
Her Highness Sree Padmanabhasevini, Vanchidharma Vardhini, Raja Rajeshwari, Maharani Pooradam Thirunal Sethu Lakshmi Bayi, Maharaja, Attingal Mootha Thampuran, Companion of the Imperial Order of the Crown of India, Maharani Regent of Travancore.

See also
 Maharani
 Princely State

References
  

Raghunandan, Lakshmi (1995) At the turn of the tide : the life and times of Maharani Setu Lakshmi Bayi, the last queen of Travancore Maharani Setu Lakshmi Bayi Memorial Charitable Trust, Bangalore;
 Gandhi, Mohandas Karamchand Young India
 A Survey of Kerala History, A. Sreedhara Menon, page 345 and 346
 Travancore State Manual Vol II by Velu Pillai
 Varma, Shreekumar (2 March 2006) "Women on Top" The Sunday Express India
 Malayala Manorama
 Triumph and Tragedy in Travancore: Annals of Sir CPs Sixteen Years by A. Sreedhara Menon

External links

 Supreme Court of India Revathinnal Balagopala Varma vs His Highness Shri Padmanabhadasa on 28 November 1991
 Varma, Shreekumar (5 February 2006) "Benign presence" The Hindu Chennai (Madras), India;
[ The Ivory Throne, M.S. Pillai ]

Kingdom of Travancore
1895 births
1985 deaths
People from Thiruvananthapuram
History of Kerala
Women in Kerala politics
Indian female royalty
20th-century Indian monarchs
20th-century women rulers
Companions of the Order of the Crown of India
Indian princesses
Hindu monarchs
Maharajas of Travancore
Politicians from Thiruvananthapuram
People of the Kingdom of Travancore
19th-century Indian women
19th-century Indian people
20th-century Indian women politicians
20th-century Indian politicians
Women of the Kingdom of Travancore
Women from Kerala